Paruyr Skayordi was crowned King of Armenia  in 612 BC.

Name 
The name "Paruyr", as was suggested by Grigor Ghapantsyan, is derived from the name of the scythian leader Bartatua. Paruyr Skayordi can be understood  "son of a giant" or son of a Saka, although the latter is very unlikely.

History 
Mikayel Chamchian, in the first volume of his "History", published in Venice in 1785, lists the most ancient rulers of Armenia, indicating the duration of their reign. Boris Piotrovsky suggests that Chamchian may have had at his disposal a source unknown to us, indicating the exact dates of the reign of these kings. The beginning of the reign of Paruyr Chamchian refers to 748 BC. e., and the death of Ashurbanipal (Khorenatsi, like all ancient writers, calls him Sardanapalus).

References 

Kings of Armenia